This was the first edition of the tournament.

Patricia Maria Țig won the title, defeating Alison Van Uytvanck in the final, 3–6, 6–1, 6–2.

Seeds

Draw

Finals

Top half

Bottom half

Qualifying

Seeds

Qualifiers

Lucky loser
  Liana Cammilleri

Qualifying draw

First qualifier

Second qualifier

Third qualifier

Fourth qualifier

References

External Links
Main Draw
Qualifying Draw

Karlsruhe Open - Singles